The 426th Tactical Intelligence Group is an inactive United States Air Force unit. It was active as the 426th Reconnaissance Group in 1943, but was disbanded before becoming fully organized.  It was reconstituted as a military intelligence unit in 1985, but has not been active since.

History
The 426th Reconnaissance Group was activated at Gainesville Army Air Field, Texas on 1 July 1943.  It was apparently never fully organized, although its 45th Reconnaissance Squadron and 47th Liaison Squadron apparently began to receive aircraft.  These two squadrons were transferred out of the group on 11 August 1943, and the group and its remaining components were disbanded four days later.

The group was reconstituted in 1983 as the 426th Tactical Intelligence Group, but has not been active since then.

Lineage
 Constituted as the 426th Reconnaissance Group on 25 June 1943
 Activated on 1 July 1943
 Disbanded on 15 August 1943
 Reconstituted on 15 July 1983 as the 426th Tactical Intelligence Group

Assignments
 III Air Support Command, 1 July 1943 – 15 August 1943

Components
 44th Reconnaissance Squadron (Fighter), 1 July 1943 – 15 August 1943
 45th Reconnaissance Squadron (Fighter), 1 July 1943 – 11 August 1943
 46th Reconnaissance Squadron (Bomber), 1 July 1943 – 15 August 1943
 47th Liaison Squadron, 1 July 1943 – 11 August 1943

Stations
 Gainesville Army Air Field, Texas, 1 July 1943 – 15 August 1943

Aircraft

 Stinson L-1 Vigilant
 Taylorcraft L-2 Grasshopper
 Aeronca L-3 Grasshopper
 Piper L-4
 Stinson L-5 Sentinel
 North American O-47
 Bell P-39 Airacobra

References

Notes

Bibliography

External links

Military units and formations established in 1943
Reconnaissance groups of the United States Army Air Forces
Military units and formations disestablished in 1943